Bishnupriya Manipuri, also known as Bishnupriya Meitei or simply as Bishnupriya, is an Indo-Aryan language belonging to the Bengali–Assamese linguistic sub-branch. It is a creole of Bengali language and Meitei language (also called Manipuri language) and it still retains its pre-Bengali features. It is spoken in parts of the Indian states of Assam, Tripura and Manipur as well as in the Sylhet Division of Bangladesh. It uses the Bengali-Assamese script as its  writing system. Bishnupriya Manipuri, being a member of the Eastern Indo-Aryan languages, was evolved from Magadhi Prakrit. So, its origin is associated with Magadha realm. The Government of Tripura categorized Bishnnupriya Manipuri under the "Tribal Language Cell" of the State Council of Educational Research and Training. Its speakers are also given the "Other Backward Classes" status by the Assam Government and notably, there is no legal status of the Bishnupriyas in Manipur.
In the 2020s, the Bishnupriya speaking people started demanding  that the Assam Government should give them the status of “indigenous people” of Assam and treat the same like other indigenous communities of the state.

According to Sahitya Akademi honorary fellow British linguist Ronald E. Asher and Christopher Moseley, Bishnupriya is a mixed language spoken by former Bengali immigrants, with substantial Meithei lexicon but basically Bengali structure and reduced morphology.

According to English linguist and historian Andrew Dalby, Bishnupriya (also known as "Mayang") is historically a form of Bengali language once current in Manipur.

According to American linguist David Bradley's research works published by the Department of Linguistics, Research School of Pacific and Asian Studies in the Australian National University, Bishnupriya is spoken by former Bengali subjects, with some Manipuri lexicon and reduced morphology.

History and development 

Bishnupriya is a member of the Māgadhan languages (Eastern Indo-Aryan languages), having origin associated with Magadha.
Bishnupriya is one of the Bengali–Assamese languages

 Bengali–Assamese:
 Bengali-Gauda
 Rarhi (Standard Bengali)
 Bangali (Dhakaiya Kutti)
 Bishnupriya Manipuri
 Chakma
 Chittagonian
 Hajong
 Manbhumi
 Noakhailla
 Rohingya
  Sundarbani
 Sylheti
 Tanchangya
 Varendri
 Kamarupic:
 Assamese (Kamrupi, Goalpariya)
 Rangpuri, Surjapuri, Rajbanshi

KP Sinha, who has done considerable research on Bishnupriya Manipuri, disagrees with the theory of Bishnupriya being associated with the Manipur (Mahabharata) and is of the opinion that the language was originated through Magadhi Prakrit. It is found from his observations that the language has retained dominant characteristics of Magadhi. According to Sinha, pronouns and declensional and conjugational endings seem to be same as or closely related to those of Maithili, Oriya and Bengali. These forms of Oriya, Bengali, etc. are on their parts, derived from Magadhi Apabhramsa coming from the Magadhi Prakrita.

However, the Bishnupriya Manipuri language is certainly not one of the Tibeto-Burman languages, but is closer to the Indo-Aryan group of languages with remarkable influence from Meitei both grammatically and phonetically. At a different stage of development of the language the Sauraseni, Maharashtri and Magadhi languages and the Tibeto-Burman languages exerted influence on it as well. So it was probably developed from Sanskrit, Sauraseni-Maharashtri Prakrit and Magadhi Prakrita. The Sauraseni-Maharastri relation can be traced by observing some characteristics of pronouns. The Magadhi element is also remarkable, as the language retains many characteristics of Magadhi.

Conflict of classification as a dialect of Bengali and Assamese 
Several scholars and linguists opine Bishnupriya as a dialect of Bengali language while many opine it as a dialect of Assamese language. At the same time, closer to the observations of the status of being a Bengali dialect, many renowned scholars opine Bishnupriya as a creole language (mixed  language) of Bengali language and Meitei language, by retaining its pre-Bengali features in present times.

After all, it is obvious that Bishnupriya is greatly influenced by Meitei (a Tibeto-Burman language) and other Indo-Aryan languages, including Assamese and Bengali to a great extent.

Bishnupriya as a dialect of Bengali

Suniti Kumar Chatterjee's opinion 
Renowned Padma Vibhushan awardee Indian linguist Suniti Kumar Chatterji who is also a recognised Bengali phonetician, listed the Bishnupriya to be a dialect of Bengali language.

Ningthoukhongjam Khelchandra's opinion 
According to renowned Padma Shri awardee Indian scholar Ningthoukhongjam Khelchandra, "Bishnupriya" is a fragmented Bengali Hindu community, originally native to Assam-Bengal trans border areas. When they migrated and lived in Bishnupur, Manipur (formerly known as "Lamangdong"), they were known as "Bishnupuriyas", and later corrupted as "Bishnupriyas". Ethnolinguistically, they are Bengalis. Unlike the large number of Bengali-Assamese immigrants in Manipur being assimilated into Meitei ethnicity until the 18th century, they remain un-assimilated.

Bishnupriya as a Bengali-Meitei creole

Opinions of William Frawley and Colin Masica 
According to scholar William Frawley, Bishnupriya was once a creole language of Bengali and Meitei and still now, it retains its pre Bengali features.
American linguist and professor Masica also has the same opinion like that of William.

Chelliah's opinion 
According to Chelliah, Bishnupriya Manipuri is a mixed language spoken by former Bengali immigrants, having significant amount of Meitei lexicons. Bishnupriya still retains its basic Bengali structural and morphological features.

Bishnupriya as a dialect of Assamese 
Several Irish and Indian linguists and scholars including George Abraham Grierson, Maheswar Neog and Banikanta Kakati opine Bishnupriya as a dialect of Assamese language.

Linguistic survey of India 
According to the Linguistic Survey of India led by Grierson, "Bishnupriya" alias "Mayang" (Code no. 555) is a dialect of Assamese language (Code no. 552).

Meitei elements in Bishnupriya 
Bishnupriya has 4000 borrowed root words from Meitei language.
Bishnupriya Manipuri retains the old eighteen sounds of Meitei. Of them, there were three vowels, such as ɑ, i and u, thirteen consonants such as p, t, k, pʰ, tʰ, kʰ, c͡ʃ, m, n, ŋ, l, ʃ, h and two semi-vowels, such as w and j. In later stage nine more sounds added to Meitei but Bishnupriya is not concerned with them, because the Bishnupriyas left Manipur during the first part of 19th century. That is why Bishnupriya Manipuri retains the older sounds of Meitei, whereas in Meitei itself the sound system has under-gone various changes.

Vocabulary
Like other Indic languages, the core vocabulary of Bishnupriya Manipuri is made up of tadbhava words (i.e. words inherited over time from older Indic languages, including Sanskrit, including many historical changes in grammar and pronunciation), although thousands of tatsama words (i.e. words that were re-borrowed directly from Sanskrit with little phonetic or grammatical change) augment the vocabulary greatly. In addition, many other words were borrowed from languages spoken in the region either natively or as a colonial language, including Meitei, English, and Perso-Arabic.

Inherited/native Indic words (tadbhava): 10,000 (Of these, 2,000 are only found in Bishnupriya Manipuri, and have not been inherited by other Indic languages)
Words re-borrowed from Sanskrit (tatsama): 10,000
Words re-borrowed from Sanskrit, partially modified (ardhatatsama): 1,500
Words borrowed from Meitei: 4000
Words borrowed from other indigenous non-Indic languages (desi): 1,500
Words borrowed from Perso-Arabic: 2,000
Words borrowed from English: 700
Hybrid words: 1,000
Words of obscure origin: 1,300

Notes and references

Further reading 
 Vasatatvar Ruprekha/ Dr. K. P. Sinha, Silchar, 1977
 Manipuri jaatisotta bitorko: ekti niropekkho paath /Ashim Kumar Singha, Sylhet, 2001
 G. K. Ghose / Tribals and Their Culture in Manipur and Nagaland, 1982
 Raj Mohan Nath / The Background of Assamese Culture, 2nd edn, 1978
 Sir G. A. Grierson / Linguistic Survey of India, Vol-5, 1903
 Dr. K. P. Sinha / An Etymological Dictionary of Bishnupriya Manipuri, 1982
 Dr. M. Kirti Singh / Religious developments in Manipur in the 18th and 19th centuuy, Imphal, 1980
 Singha, Jagat Mohan & Singha, Birendra / The Bishnupriya Manipuris & Their Language, silchar, 1976
 Parimal Sinha and Anup Sinha / Bishnupuriya language Development, 2017.

External links 

 Bishnupriya Manipuri: A brief introduction
  Details on Bishnupriya Manipuri Language
  Archive of Bishnupriya Manipuri Literature
 
  Bishnupriya Manipuri society 

Bengali dialects
Pidgins and creoles
Indo-Aryan languages
Languages of Bangladesh
Languages of India
Languages of Northeast India
Mixed languages